Pokhemma is a type of food used by Kirat as an offering for their ancestors. It is simply boiled beans, served strictly without salt.

See also
 List of Nepalese dishes

References

Nepalese cuisine
Ceremonial food and drink
Legume dishes